Achlum is a village in the Waadhoeke municipality of  Friesland, Netherlands. It is approximately 7km southwest of the city of Franeker.

Achlum had about 629 inhabitants in January 2014.

History 
Before 2018, the village was part of the Franekeradeel municipality. The village has a church which dates from the 12th century and is placed atop a so-called terp mound. Around the year 1260 there was a priory of Augustinian nuns, a part of the Lúntsjerk monastery which was destroyed in 1530. At that time the prior in Achlum was rebuilt but in 1572 the Geuzen destroyed it again. In Achlum used to be a butter factory which processed the milk of local farmers to butter.

In 1811 a farmer from Achlum called Ulbe Piers Draisma established a mutual fire insurance. The insurance society was called Onderlinge Waarborgmaatschappij Achlum.

De Achlumer Molen is a smock mill in Achlum which has been restored to working order. The mill is listed as a Rijksmonument, number 15821.

Community

Population 
 2009 - 635
 2008 - 652
 2005 - 663
 2004 - 666
 2003 - 664
 2002 - 674
 2001 - 679
 2000 - 668
 1999 - 652
 1973 - 738
 1969 - 796
 1964 - 824
 1959 - 881
 1954 - 889

Notable residents 
  (1785–1830)), founder of insurance company Achmea

Gallery

References

Waadhoeke
Populated places in Friesland